The 1997 Giro d'Italia was the 80th edition of the Giro d'Italia, one of cycling's Grand Tours. The Giro began in Venice, with a flat stage on 17 May, and Stage 12 occurred on 29 May with a stage from La Spezia. The race finished in Milan on 8 June.

Stage 12
29 May 1997 — La Spezia to Varazze,

Stage 13
30 May 1997 — Varazze to Cuneo,

Stage 14
31 May 1997 — Racconigi to Breuil-Cervinia,

Stage 15
1 June 1997 — Verrès to Borgomanero,

Stage 16
2 June 1997 — Borgomanero to Dalmine,

Stage 17
3 June 1997 — Dalmine to Verona,

Stage 18
4 June 1997 — Baselga di Pinè to Cavalese,  (ITT)

Stage 19
5 June 1997 — Predazzo to Pfalzen,

Stage 20
6 June 1997 — Brunico to Passo del Tonale,

Stage 21
7 June 1997 — Malè to Edolo,

Stage 22
8 June 1997 — Boario Terme to Milan,

References

1997 Giro d'Italia
Giro d'Italia stages